The 1953 Western Australian state election was held on 14 February 1953.

Retiring Members

Labor

 Ted Needham (MLA) (North Perth)

Independent 

 William Read (MLA) (Victoria Park)

Legislative Assembly
Sitting members are shown in bold text. Successful candidates are highlighted in the relevant colour. Where there is possible confusion, an asterisk (*) is also used.

See also
 Members of the Western Australian Legislative Assembly, 1950–1953
 Members of the Western Australian Legislative Assembly, 1953–1956
 1953 Western Australian state election

References
 

Candidates for Western Australian state elections